Peter Jonson or Johnson was a London shoemaker who worked for Elizabeth I and James VI and I. The records of shoes he made gives an idea of changing fashions.

Most of Elizabeth's shoes were made by his father, or relation, Garret Johnson until 1590. In 1564, Garret Johnson made a dozen pairs velvet shoes with velvet covered cork and wooden heels and "rames". At this time Elizabeth had shoes made from Spanish leather, and he made leather shoes for Aura Soltana. Garret Johnson also supplied six shoes horns to the queen in 1563 and 1564. These were the first recorded shoes for the queen made with heels.

In Scotland, the shoes of Mary, Queen of Scots and Lord Darnley at this time were made by Fremyn Alezard.

Peter Jonson made shoes for Thomasina the court dwarf in 1594. In 1595 Peter Jonson made shoes for Queen Elizabeth with high heels and arches. The warrant or order, quoted by the historian Janet Arnold gives an idea of his work, in modern spelling:Peter Jonson for 8 pair of Spanish leather shoes of sundry colours; 6 pair of Spanish leather leather "pantobles" of sundry colours; one pair of Spanish leather shoes with high heels and arches; one pair straw colour "pantobles" with arches, and laid on (decorated) with silver lace; for translating (repairing and refashioning) of one pair of cloth of silver pantobles lined with white satin; for translating one pair of shoes with high heel; and for translating 8 pairs of shoes and pantobles of our great wardrobe.

After the Union of the Crowns in 1603, Peter Jonson made shoes for King James and Anne of Denmark, some were said to be in "Belone" fashion, possibly the clerk's error for Polish or Bolognese.

References

Court of Elizabeth I
Court of James VI and I
16th-century English businesspeople
Shoemakers
Material culture of royal courts